Air Academy High School (AAHS) is a public high school in El Paso County, Colorado, United States that serves the northwestern end of Colorado Springs, Colorado, as well as the United States Air Force Academy. Air Academy is a part of Academy School District 20. It is the only high school in the U.S. built on a military academy (the school district also has an elementary school on the Air Force Academy).

Academics

AAHS offers Advanced Placement classes to students in numerous subject areas.

Athletics

Air Academy offers varsity and junior varsity athletic teams competing in Colorado High School Activities Association 4A and 5A sporting events. Facilities at the school include two gyms, a weights facility, a track, a yoga and fitness room, soccer, baseball, and softball field, eight tennis court, and an outdoor football/soccer stadium (nicknamed the K-Dome).
Bill Mondt coached Kadet football to a state football championship in 1962; he went on to be head coach at New Mexico University and later coached successfully at Eaton CO High School
Gary Barnett was the head football coach at AAHS in the 1970s; he was later the head coach at Northwestern (1992–1998) and Colorado (1999–2005).

Notable alumni

 T. A. Barron, fantasy writer
 Gregg Brandon, football coach
 Donald Cerrone, retired professional mixed martial artist, formerly with World Extreme Cagefighting, recently retired from Ultimate Fighting Championship
 Pat Forde, sports journalist currently with Sports Illustrated
 Linden King, retired professional football player...Chargers and Raiders
 Wil McCarthy, inventor, scientist, science fiction writer
 John Novembre, MacArthur Genius Award winner; Professor of Computational Genetics, University of Chicago
 Pat Rice, former MLB player (Seattle Mariners) and career pitching coach
 Eric Franklin Rosser, former keyboardist for John Mellencamp
 Matt Slauson, professional football player...NFL Chargers and others
 Maxwell Atoms, Creator of the Cartoon Network series Grim and Evil, The Grim Adventures of Billy & Mandy, Evil Con Carne
Steven Alexander, Award winning producer and director
Rodney Zimmerman, Professional basketball player NBA and Europe
Jeff King, Professional baseball player MLB Pirates and Royals

James V. Carnes, football player and musician

See also 
 Academy School District 20

References

External links
 

Educational institutions established in 1957
Public high schools in Colorado
Schools in El Paso County, Colorado
1957 establishments in Colorado